Jorge Erdely Graham is a Mexican theologian, religious studies scholar, and author.

He is associate editor of Revista Académica para el Estudio de las Religiones, a member of the American Academy of Religion and former director of Centro de Investigaciones del Instituto Cristiano de Mexico.

He obtained a bachelor's degree in biological sciences from University of Mary Hardin–Baylor and a doctorate in philosophy from Newport University. Later, Erdely Graham completed a fellowship in Theology at the Graduate Theological Foundation.

Bibliography 
 Secrecy and the Institutionalization of Sexual Abuse: The Case of La Luz del Mundo in Mexico. (2009)

References

External links 
 Official author website

Year of birth missing (living people)
Living people
Mexican businesspeople
Newport University (California) alumni
Mexican male writers